Acronychia suberosa, commonly known as corky acronychia, is a species of small to medium-sized rainforest tree that is endemic to eastern Australia. It has mostly trifoliate leaves with elliptic to egg-shaped leaflets with the narrower end towards the base, small groups of cream-coloured flowers and elliptical to spherical, creamy yellow to whitish fruit.

Description
The trunk is mostly cylindrical, but occasionally with flanges at the base and the bark is usually smooth, brown or red-brown. The fruit matures from March to June.

Taxonomy
Acronychia suberosa was first formally described in 1932 by Cyril Tenison White in Proceedings of the Royal Society of Queensland from specimens collected in Lamington National Park in 1929. The specific epithet suberosa means corky, referring to the bark on older trees.

Distribution and habitat
The habitat is sub-tropical or warm temperate rainforest on basalt soils in high rainfall areas.

Uses

Food
The fruit is edible but acidic.

Horticulture
Removal of the flesh from the seed is advised for regeneration. Around 30% of the seeds may germinate in five months.

References

 

suberosa
Trees of Australia
Flora of New South Wales
Flora of Queensland
Plants described in 1932
Taxa named by Cyril Tenison White